Charles Edward Butler (July 9, 1908 – July 13, 1981) was an American poet.

Life
He was born in Denver, Colorado and graduated from the University of Colorado and the University of Chicago Graduate Library School. He served in the United States Army Air Forces in England in World War II where he wrote poetry. He was a staff sergeant. He went on the be a librarian at Longwood College in Farmville, Virginia.

His work appeared in The Atlantic, Poetry, Yank.

Awards
 1945 Yale Series of Younger Poets Competition for "Cut Is the Branch"
 1951 Guggenheim Fellow

Works
 Cut is the branch, etc., Yale University Press, 1945

Anthologies
 The Best from Yank the Army Weekly, World Publishing Co., Editors of Yank, 1945

References

1908 births
1981 deaths
20th-century American poets
Yale Younger Poets winners
United States Army Air Forces soldiers
United States Army Air Forces personnel of World War II